Jiangnan Bielu (江南别錄; "Alternative Records of Jiangnan") was a book written by scholar Chen Pengnian during imperial China's Northern Song Dynasty (960–1126) on the history of Southern Tang (937–976), a regime in the Five Dynasties and Ten Kingdoms period. It was later included in the Siku Quanshu.

References
 

Chinese history texts
Song dynasty literature
Southern Tang
11th-century Chinese books